The 1998 Australian Super Touring Championship was the sixth running of a CAMS sanctioned motor racing series in Australia under the Super Touring Car regulations and the fourth to carry the Australian Super Touring Championship name.  It began on 5 April 1998 at Calder Park Raceway and ended on 30 August at Oran Park Raceway after eight rounds. The series was promoted by TOCA Australia as the 1998 BOC Gases Australian Super Touring Championship. As in the British Touring Car Championship the race format changed with each meeting now consisting a shorter "sprint" race and a "feature" race, 25% longer than previous races featuring a mandatory two-tyre stop to be taken between 15 and 75% distance. The one exception was the round at Lakeside Raceway where the pit lane was deemed unsuitable.

Team and Driver changes 
 1997 championship winners Paul Morris and BMW left the series as BMW scaled back its touring car operation.
 Volvo switched from the 850 to the new S40 for Jim Richards. 
 Cameron McLean drove the 1997 championship winning BMW switching from the Opel/Holden Vectra he raced in 1997.
 Tony Newman upgraded to an ex BTCC Peugeot 406
 Mark Adderton switched from the Phoenix Motorsport Toyota Camry to a Honda Accord.

Entry List
The following teams and drivers competed in the 1998 Australian Super Touring Championship.

Results and standings

Race calendar
The 1998 Australian Super Touring Championship was contested over eight rounds with two races per round.

Drivers Championship
Points were awarded 15-12-10-8-6-5-4-3-2-1 based on the top ten race positions in each race. There was a bonus point allocated for pole position.

Manufacturers Championship

Teams Championship

TOCA Challenge - Independents Cup

Independents Cup points were awarded on a 15-12-10-8-6-5-4-3-2-1 basis for relative positions achieved by drivers in entries nominated as Independents at each race.

The TOCA Challenge - Independents Cup was won by Cameron McLean in his Greenfield Mowers Racing-entered BMW 320i, scoring 205 points. Second was Mark Adderton on 151 points, and third was Peter Hills on 136 points.

References

External links
 1998 Racing Results Archive at www.natsoft.com.au
 1998 Australian Super Touring Championship at www.teamdan.com
 1998 Australian Super Touring Championship entry list at www.supertouringregister.com

Australian Super Touring Championship
Super Touring Car Championship